Nanyadeva was the founder of the Karnata (Karan Kayastha) dynasty of Mithila. He was the ancestor of Harisimhadeva and descendant of Suheldev . He established his capital in Simraungadh and ruled the greater Mithila region for 50 years. 
He is known for his generosity, courage, and patronage of scholars. He was from Karnat Kshatriya (Karna Kayastha) Kula
and began to rule Mithila from Simraungadh in 1097 CE. The stone inscription found at Simraongarh and Nepālavaṃśāvalī clearly states that he made an erection in a Singha Lagna of a Saturday in a Sravana, the tithi being Sukla seven and the Naksatara Svati in the year 1019 Shaka (July 10, 1097 AD).

Etymology and names
Nanya is a word of Karnatic origin and Sanskritised form of Nanniya. Nanyadeva means "the dearest of god" (Nanya means "dearest" and deva means "god"). The Andhratharhi inscription of his minister, Shridhardas refers Nanyadeva as Mahasamantadhipati, Dharmamavaloka and Sriman Nanyapati.

Early life
It is believed that Nanyadeva arrived in the region as part of the Chalukaya invasions of the North during the second half of the 11th century. The Chalukyas would likely have been accompanied by many military adventurers who carved out small principalities of their own in North Bihar and Nanyadeva would have been among them. His original stronghold was Nanapura in Champaran district of Bihar however he later shifted his capital to Simraungadh in modern-day Nepal which would remain as the main capital until the end of the Karnat dynasty.

Rule of Mithila
In Vidyapati's Purush Pariksa, Nanyadeva is confirmed to have gained control of Mithila by 1097 CE. During his rule, Mithila came into conflict with the Pala dynasty of Bengal.

Legacy
Many modern scholars, as well as the people of the region, view Nanyadeva as a "son of Mithila" who liberated the region following the fall of the Videhan monarchy. The Karnata rule is not viewed as foreign as they established their power in Mithila itself, unlike others who ruled from outside. he was succeeded by two sons, Gangadeva and Malladeva.

Literary works
He cultivated several melodies and recorded his knowledge in the Sanskrit musicological treatise called the Sarasvati Hridayalankara and the Grantha-Maharnava. These works are an in-depth assessment of different musical notes and how they can lead to certain feelings and sentiments ranging from heroism to anger. He completed these works following his ascendance to power in Mithila.

Descendants

After the fall of the Karnat empire and the power vacuum, the maithil Brahmins with the patronage and protection of the Tughlaks were able to come to the throne and form the Oinwar dynasty. Karnats mainly split into two branches, the ones that fled to Nepal and formed the Malla dynasty and those that chose to remain in Mithila (Tirhut) and adopted a new profession acceptable to the new rulers (Tax collection and administration) and came to be known as the Karna kayasthas (settled in the 32 gamas or villages of Mithila). The new ruling elite disbanded their legitimate ancestral title "Thakkura" and made it their own and forced them to adopt non kingly titles like - Lal Das, Verma, Mallick, Kanth, Karna etc.
Pratap Malla of the Malla dynasty of Kathmandu also declared Nanyadeva to be his Pradhan Purva Purasha (founding father).

References 

12th-century monarchs in Asia
History of Bihar
History of Nepal
11th-century Nepalese people
12th-century Nepalese people